Artificial kidney is often a synonym for hemodialysis, but may also refer to the other renal replacement therapies (with exclusion of kidney transplantation) that are in use and/or in development. This article deals mainly with bioengineered kidneys/bioartificial kidneys that are grown from renal cell lines/renal tissue.

The first successful artificial kidney was developed by Willem Kolff in the Netherlands during the early 1940s: Kolff was the first to construct a working dialyzer in 1943.

Medical uses

Kidney failure
Kidneys are paired vital organs located behind the abdominal cavity at the bottom of the ribcage corresponding to the levels T12-L3 of the spine vertebrae. They perform about a dozen physiologic functions and are fairly easily damaged. Some of these functions include filtration and excretion of metabolic waste products, regulation of necessary electrolytes and fluids and stimulation of red blood cell-production. These organs routinely filter about 100 to 140 liters of blood a day to produce 1 to 2 liters of urine, composed of wastes and excess fluid.

Kidney failure results in the slow accumulation of nitrogenous wastes, salts, water, and disruption of the body's normal pH balance. This failure typically occurs over a long period of time, and when the patient's renal function declines enough over the course of the disease, is commonly known as end stage renal disease (ESRD; which is also known as Level 5 or 6 kidney disease, depending on whether dialysis or renal replacement therapy is used). Detecting kidney disease before the kidneys start to shut down is uncommon, with high blood pressure and decreased appetite being symptoms that indicate a problem. Diabetes and high blood pressure are seen as the 2 most common causes of kidney failure. Experts predict that the demand for dialysis will increase as the prevalence of diabetes increases. Until the Second World War, kidney failure generally meant death for the patient. Several insights into kidney function and acute kidney failure were made during the war.

One in three American adults are at a risk for developing kidney disease. Over 26 million American adults have kidney disease and most are not aware of it. More than 661,000 of them have kidney failure and 468,000 are on dialysis. The large population of individuals with kidney failure drives continuing advancements in the technology of artificial kidneys so that more people can have access to treatments.

Home hemodialysis has become rare because of its disadvantages. It is expensive, time-consuming and space inefficient. In 1980, 9.7% of the dialysis population was on home hemodialysis but by 1987 the proportion had dropped to 3.6%.

According to a 2011 report by the Organization for Economic Cooperation and Development, the United States of America has the second-highest rate of dialysis among advanced countries after Japan. The United States has the highest mortality rate among patients with ESRD. On average 20% of American ESRD patients die annually, which is more than twice that of Japan. The growth of dialysis facilities in the United States is the result of more Americans developing end-stage renal disease. From 2001 to 2011 the number increased by about 49.7% from 411,000 citizens to 615,000 citizens. In 2001 there were only 296,000 Americans on some form of dialysis. Ten years later that number increased to more than 430,000 as a result of chronic conditions developing such as diabetes and hypertension.

Need for a bioartificial kidney
Over 300,000 Americans are dependent on hemodialysis as treatment for kidney failure, but according to data from the 2005 USRDS 452,000 Americans have end-stage kidney disease (ESKD). Intriguing investigations from groups in London, Ontario and Toronto, Ontario have suggested that dialysis treatments lasting two to three times as long as, and delivered more frequently than, conventional thrice weekly treatments may be associated with improved clinical outcomes.  Implementing six-times weekly, all-night dialysis would overwhelm existing resources in most countries. This, as well as scarcity of donor organs for kidney transplantation has prompted research in developing alternative therapies, including the development of a wearable or implantable device.

Proposed solutions

Artificial kidney

Hemodialysis is a method for removing waste products such as creatinine and urea, as well as free water from the blood when the kidneys are in kidney failure. The mechanical device used to clean the patient's blood is called a dialyser, also known as an artificial kidney. Modern dialysers typically consist of a cylindrical rigid casing enclosing hollow fibers cast or extruded from a polymer or copolymer, which is usually a proprietary formulation.  The combined area of the hollow fibers is typically between 1-2 square meters. Intensive research has been conducted by many groups to optimize blood and dialysate flows within the dialyser, in order to achieve efficient transfer of wastes from blood to dialysate.

Implantable artificial kidney
The implantable artificial kidney is a second project that is being co-developed by a nephrologist named William H. Fissell IV, MD, from the Vanderbilt University Medical Center with Professor Shuvo Roy from the University of California, San Francisco. Fissell and his colleagues have been working on the implantable artificial kidney for over a decade but recently received a 6-million-dollar grant in November 2015 to further continue the research and development of the project. The goal of this project is to create a bio-hybrid device that can imitate the functions of a healthy kidney by removing enough waste products to keep a patient from needing dialysis treatment. The key to the success of this device is the use of silicon nanotechnology and the microchip which is porous and can act as a natural filter. Fissell and his team have designed each pore (of the filter) to perform a specific function or task. The microchips will also act as a platform for which living kidney cells will reside and grow on and around the filters with the goal of imitating the natural functions of the kidney. The bio-hybrid device will not be in reach of the body's immune response which allows it to be protected against being rejected by the patient's body. The device will be designed to be small enough to fit inside a patient's body that will successfully operate with the patient's natural blood flow. Fissell and his research team continue to make progress and they expected the implantable artificial kidney would enter human trials by 2017.

Wearable artificial kidney
A wearable artificial kidney is a wearable dialysis machine that a person with end-stage kidney disease could use daily or even continuously. A wearable artificial kidney (WAK) is not available, but research teams are in the process of developing such a device. The goal is to develop a portable device that will be able to imitate the functions of the regular kidney. This device would allow for a patient to be treated twenty-four hours a day. With the development of miniature pumps, the hope of an effective wearable hemodialysis device has become realizable. Some patients already receive continuous peritoneal dialysis treatment which allows them to remain ambulatory. However, only a small portion of dialysis patients use peritoneal dialysis treatment because it requires large amounts of dialysate to be stored and disposed. A healthy individual's kidneys filter blood 24 hours/day, 168 hours/week compared to an individual with end-stage renal disease whose dialysis treatment plan is approximately 12 hours a week. The treatment results in a lower quality of life as well as a higher mortality rate for patients with end stage renal disease (ESRD). Therefore, there is a need for an around-the-clock device that will allow ESRD patients to receive dialysis continuously while maintaining a normal life. The FDA approved the first human clinical trial in the United States for a wearable artificial kidney designed by Blood Purification Technologies Inc. The prototype of the WAK is a 10-pound device, powered by nine-volt batteries, which connects to a patient via a catheter, and should use less than 500mL of dialysate. It is designed to run continuously on batteries, allowing patients to remain ambulatory when wearing the device, leading to a greater quality of life. The device is designed to improve other physiological aspects of the patient's health such as improved volume control, decreased hypertension and sodium retention, as well as a decreased rate of cardiovascular disease and stroke.

Experiments of the wearable artificial kidney
The wearable artificial kidney (WAK) has constantly been modified throughout the years for the better of people who have kidney failure. To try and make the WAK usable, several experiments have been conducted. While conducting these experiments for the WAK, similar goals are trying to be achieved. For example, a main goal that these experiments are trying to achieve is to make sure that the WAK can function like a regular kidney.

One experiment that took place included eight people who wore the WAK for four to eight hours. As the participants wore the WAK, several outcomes occurred. For example, one outcome during the experiment was that the fluid removal for the WAK was controlled correctly by an ultrafiltration pump. Another outcome that took place during this experiment was that a needle connected to the WAK ended up disconnecting itself. When this happened, the WAK was able to recognize this, and the blood stopped pumping. When the blood stopped pumping, the needle could be reinserted without the body losing a large amount of blood. As other research has been conducted, it has been argued that using an ultrafiltration pump may not be the best pump for the WAK. For example, research has found that by using a peristaltic pump instead, would allow a person to know their blood flow rate without having a sensor, which is needed in an ultrafiltration pump used in the experiment mentioned above. A change in the type of pump used for the WAK may be crucial because it could help make the device cheaper and more reliable for the public by not having a sensor.

After doing a lot of research on the WAK, several research questions have been answered. For example, researchers have found out that the WAK can work without an outlet because it has been able to function on a nine-volt battery. Although, it has been argued by researchers that using nine-volt batteries are not effective enough for the WAK because it does not power the device long enough and indirectly it makes the WAK less affordable when having to constantly change the batteries. Due to this, other energy sources are being explored, for example, researchers are seeing if fuel cells, wireless transmission of energy from an active source, or harvesting energy from the environment would be better ways to power the WAK for longer periods of time. Several questions have been answered about the WAK, but many research questions are still left unanswered. Researchers are still trying to figure out if the WAK can be energy efficient, affordable, and if it can reuse small amounts of dialysate.

Implantable renal assist device (IRAD)
Currently, no viable bioengineered kidneys exist. Although a great deal of research is underway, numerous barriers exist to their creation.

However, manufacturing a membrane that mimics the kidney's ability to filter blood and subsequently excrete toxins while reabsorbing water and salt would allow for a wearable and/or implantable artificial kidney. Developing a membrane using microelectromechanical systems (MEMS) technology is a limiting step in creating an implantable, bioartificial kidney.

The BioMEMS and Renal Nanotechnology Laboratories at the Cleveland Clinic's Lerner Research Institute have focused on advancing membrane technology to develop an implantable or wearable therapy for end-stage kidney disease (ESKD). Current dialysis cartridges are too large and require superphysiologic pressures for blood circulation, and pores in current polymer membranes have too broad of a size distribution and irregular features. Manufacturing a silicon, nanoporous membrane with narrow pore size distributions improves the membrane's ability to discriminate between filtered and retained molecules. It also increases hydraulic permeability by allowing the mean pore size to approach the desired cutoff of the membrane. Using a batch-fabrication process allows for strict control over pore size distribution and geometry.

Studies show human kidney cells were harvested from donated organs unsuitable for transplantation, and grown on these membranes.  The cultured cells covered the membranes and appear to retain features of adult kidney cells. The differentiated growth of renal epithelial cells on MEMS materials suggests that a miniaturized device suitable for implantation may be feasible.

A UCSF-led effort to create an implantable artificial kidney for dialysis patients has been selected as one of the first projects to undergo more timely and collaborative review at the Food and Drug Administration.

The FDA announced on April 9, 2012, that it had chosen three renal device projects to pilot a regulatory approval program called Innovation Pathway 2.0, intended to bring breakthrough medical device technologies to patients faster and more efficiently.

The artificial kidney project, which is targeted for clinical trials in 2017, was selected for its transformative potential in treating end stage kidney disease and for its potential to benefit from early interactions with the FDA in the approval process.

The FDA effort will involve close contact between the federal agency and device developers early in the development process to identify and address potential scientific and regulatory hurdles and create a roadmap for project approval. The goal is to improve the projects' overall chance of success, while reducing the time and cost of FDA review and maintaining safety. Lessons, the agency said, will inform approvals in other areas.

The Kidney Project is a national research initiative that focuses on the development and testing of an implanted, freestanding bioartificial kidney. The Kidney Project received six million dollars in government grants.

See also

 Artificial organ
 Kidney
 Dialysis
 Tissue engineering
 Microelectromechanical systems
 Nanotechnology
 Hemodialysis
 Hemofiltration

References

Kidney
Implants (medicine)
Membrane technology
Nephrology
Dutch inventions